HVDC HelWin2 is a high voltage direct current (HVDC) link built to transmit offshore wind power to the power grid of the German mainland. The project differs from most HVDC systems in that one of the two converter stations is built on a platform in the sea.  Voltage-Sourced Converters with DC ratings of 690 MW, ±320 kV are used and the total cable length is 130 km. The project was built by the Siemens/Prysmian consortium with the offshore platform built by Heerema in Zwijndrecht, Netherlands. The topside measures 98 m x 42 m x 28 m and weighs 10200 tonnes. The project was handed over to its owner, TenneT, in June 2015, the fourth such project to be completed in 2015.

See also

High-voltage direct current
Offshore wind power
HVDC BorWin1
HVDC BorWin2
HVDC BorWin3
HVDC DolWin1
HVDC DolWin2
HVDC DolWin3
HVDC HelWin1
HVDC SylWin1

References

External links 
Description of project on TenneT website (in German).
Factsheet – HelWin2 HVDC Platform 
 HelWin 2 HVDC system, CIGRÉ Compendium of all HVDC Projects.

Electric power transmission systems in Germany
Electrical interconnectors in the North Sea
HVDC transmission lines
Wind power in Germany
2015 establishments in Germany